This list of Florida Gators baseball players includes former members of the Florida Gators baseball team that represents the University of Florida in Gainesville, Florida, who have played in one or more regular season Major League Baseball (MLB) games.  The list includes such former Gators baseball players as David Eckstein, World Series Most Valuable Player, Al Rosen, former American League Most Valuable Player, and Haywood Sullivan, former managing partner of the Boston Red Sox.

Major League Baseball 

 Dalton Guthrie (born 1995), MLB player for the Phillies

* Attended the University of Florida, but did not play for the Florida Gators baseball team.

See also 

 Florida Gators
 List of University of Florida alumni
 List of University of Florida Athletic Hall of Fame members
 List of University of Florida Olympians

Bibliography 

  Florida Baseball 2011 Media Supplement, University Athletic Association, Gainesville, Florida, p. 104 (2011).

 
baseball